A Change of Skin (Spanish: Cambio de piel) is a 1967 novel written by Carlos Fuentes about a Mexican writer and his Jewish American wife.

Plot
This is the story about a frustrated Mexican writer named Javier, and his Jewish American wife, Elizabeth. The couple is making their way from Mexico City to Veracruz for a vacation. A man named Franz (a Czechoslovakian who helped construct the Nazi concentration camp, Theresienstadt and thereafter fled to Mexico) is with them, along with his young Mexican mistress, Isabel.

Once the two couples have left Mexico, they visit the pre-Columbian ruins at Xochicalco and then the pyramids at Cholula. Their car is sabotaged, forcing them to spend the night in Cholula. There they are joined by the ubiquitous Narrator, who is also en route to Cholula, just to complicate matters even more.

Acclaim for the book
 "At any rate, politically objectionable or not, Fuentes has written a challenging and interesting, if occasionally silly and pretentious, book." -David Gallagher, The New York Times
 "defines existentially a collective Mexican consciousness by exploring and reinterpreting the country’s myths." -Encyclopædia Britannica
 "...human history is envisioned as an obsessively repeated mythic drama or cycle." -Edith Grossman, "Myth and Madness in Carlos Fuentes' 'A Change of Skin'"
 It received the 1967 Premio Biblioteca Breve for best unpublished novel.

References

1967 novels
Novels by Carlos Fuentes
Mexican novels